The Velna is a left tributary of the river Bârlad in Romania. It crosses the village of Ipatele and joins the Bârlad near Negrești.

References

Rivers of Romania
Rivers of Iași County
Rivers of Vaslui County